The Problems of Philosophy is a 1912 book by the philosopher Bertrand Russell, in which the author attempts to create a brief and accessible guide to the problems of philosophy. He introduces philosophy as a repeating series of (failed) attempts to answer the same questions: Can we prove that there is an external world? Can we prove cause and effect? Can we validate any of our generalizations? Can we objectively justify morality? He asserts that philosophy cannot answer any of these questions and that any value of philosophy must lie elsewhere than in offering proofs to these questions.

Focusing on problems he believes will provoke positive and constructive discussion, Russell concentrates on knowledge rather than metaphysics: If it is uncertain that external objects exist, how can we then have knowledge of them but by probability. There is no reason to doubt the existence of external objects simply because of sense data.

Russell guides the reader through his famous 1910 distinction between knowledge by acquaintance and knowledge by description and introduces important theories of Plato, Aristotle, René Descartes, David Hume, John Locke, Immanuel Kant, Georg Wilhelm Friedrich Hegel and others to lay the foundation for philosophical inquiry by general readers and scholars alike.

External links 

 
 

1912 non-fiction books
Books by Bertrand Russell
English-language books
English non-fiction books